Crosspointe is a census-designated place in Fairfax County, Virginia, United States. The population as of the 2020 census was 5,722.

History 
On May 17, 1983, the William Lyon Company of Newport Beach, California, which owned the land that made up Crosspointe established the Crosspointe Village Homeowners' Association, a not for profit corporation, to provide services to Crosspointe's residents. Since then, the community has evolved into an upper middle class suburb of Washington, D.C.

Recreational and cultural activities 
The Crosspointe Community Center, located on Glen Eagles Lane (the headquarters of the Association), can be rented out for private parties.

Parks and recreation 
Crosspointe is home to several green spaces, with around 5 miles of trails.

Crosspointe is also near the Laurel Hill Golf Club in Lorton.

Crosspointe is about 1 mile from the Fairfax County Parkway Trail, about 3 miles from the Lakeridge Marina Waterfront Trail, and about 5 miles from the Bull Run Occoquan Trail. Crosspointe is also home to Heron Pond, a fishing pond. Giles Run, a tributary of the Occoquan River, begins at Heron Pond in Crosspointe and flows 6 miles to the southeast, ending at the Occoquan River in Mason Neck.

Crosspointe is home to two pools, one adjacent the clubhouse on Glen Eagles Lane, and another on Oak Chase Circle, which also has two tennis courts on the grounds.

Transportation 
Two major state highways directly serve Crosspointe: Virginia State Route 123 (Ox Road), which forms the northeastern boundary and also connects the CDP to Fairfax, Virginia State Route 286 (Fairfax County Parkway), and Virginia State Route 620 (Braddock Road) in the west, and Woodbridge, Interstate 95, and U.S. Route 1 in the east; and Virginia State Route 600 which connects Crosspointe to Lorton and Lorton Road in the east.

Geography 
It is bordered to the north by the South Run CDP, to the northeast by the Newington Forest CDP, and to the southeast by the Laurel Hill CDP. The CDP border is defined as Ox Road to the southwest, Hooes Road to the east, and South Run to the north.

Climate 
The climate in this area is characterized by hot, humid summers and generally mild to cool winters. According to the Köppen Climate Classification system, Crosspointe has a humid subtropical climate, abbreviated "Cfa" on climate maps.

Government 
Crosspointe is a census-designated place within Fairfax County; therefore, schools, roads, and law enforcement are provided by the county.

Board of directors 
The board is the legislative branch of the community government, led by the president, currently Howard Kaufer, and the vice-president, currently Larry Rice. According to the CC&Rs, the Association has the power to do anything a corporation "organized under the laws of the State of California" may lawfully do in order to maintain the peace, health, comfort, safety, general welfare of its members, subject to the regulations set forth in the CC&Rs. The Association may also construct, renovate, and landscape the Common Property and employ personnel to perform such activities.

The board also has the power to appoint and remove, at will, the three members of the Architectural Review Committee. Both the committee and the board usually meet at the Crosspointe Community Center.

Representation 
The part of Crosspointe in the Springfield District, including the Community Center, is within Virginia's 10th congressional district, currently represented in Congress by Representative Jennifer Wexton (D-Leesburg), while the part of Crosspointe in the Mt. Vernon District is within Virginia's 11th congressional district, currently represented in Congress by Representative Gerry Connolly (D-Mantua). Crosspointe is represented by Kathy Tran (D-West Springfield) in the state House of Delegates, and by George Barker (D-Clifton) in the state Senate.

Local media 
Crosspointe lies within the distribution zone for two national newspapers, the Washington Post, and the Washington Times, as well as for the local Fairfax Times. Crosspointe is also covered by AOL's Patch service's Fairfax Station and Lorton divisions.

Education

Primary and secondary schools 
As a part of Fairfax County, Crosspointe is served by the Fairfax County Public Schools and private schools. Crosspointe is served by one high school, South County High School, and one middle school, South County Middle School, both in adjacent Laurel Hill.

Public elementary schools 

 Silverbrook Elementary School
 Halley Elementary School

Colleges and universities 
Crosspointe is near a few higher education centers, including Agora University and Holy Transfiguration College.

Public libraries 
Crosspointe is served by the Lorton Library, a branch of the Fairfax County Public Library System.

Demographics 
As of 2019, Crosspointe had an estimated median household income of $193,472.

References 

Census-designated places in Fairfax County, Virginia
Census-designated places in Virginia